Bear spray is a specific   aerosol spray bear deterrent, whose active ingredients are highly irritant capsaicin and related capsaicinoids, that is used to deter aggressive or charging bears.

History
Capsaicin bear spray was developed in the mid-1980s under principal investigator Carrie Hunt, a University of Montana graduate student working under the supervision of Dr. Charles Jonkel and Dr. Bart O'Gara. Hunt had identified commercial pepper sprays as an effective deterrent for bears in previous research; however, they were unreliable and required close proximity. Hunt's thesis was published by the U.S. Fish and Wildlife Service in 1984. Bill Pounds, who eventually founded Counter Assault bear spray, assisted Hunt and offered to help devise a prototype for a reliable aerosol bear spray canister for Hunt's research. Pounds played an important part in developing the ingredients, the dispersal system, and the recommended specifications of bear spray. The product produced by the company he founded, Counter Assault, became the first Environmental Protection Agency (EPA)-registered aerosol bear spray.

Use

The key active ingredients of bear spray are 1–2% capsaicin, and related capsaicinoids.

Bear spray is intended to deter an aggressive or charging bear; a user points the canister at an aggressive bear and sprays the contents for 2–3 seconds.

Effectiveness
Bear spray is a very effective deterrent when used properly. In a 2008 review of bear attacks in Alaska from 1985 to 2006, Smith et al. found that bear spray stopped a bear's "undesirable behavior" in 92% of cases. Further, 98% of persons using bear spray in close-range encounters escaped uninjured.

The efficacy of bear spray depends on the situation and circumstances of the attack. In the 2008 study, Tom Smith of Brigham Young University reported, "No bear spray has ever been reported to kill a bear. It is our belief that widespread use of bear spray will promote human safety and bear conservation."  On the other hand, latent spray (on an object) has also led to the attraction of bears, which usually end up with the bear destroying the spray-covered object.

A United States Geological Survey article, "Bear Spray Safety Program," says that bear spray is effective in fending off aggressive bears while also preventing injury to both the human and the bear. It also states, "No deterrent is 100-percent effective." In "Living with Grizzlies," the U.S. Fish and Wildlife Service states, "The Service supports the pepper spray policy of the Interagency Grizzly bear Committee, which states that bear spray is not a substitute for following proper bear avoidance safety techniques, and that bear spray should be used as a deterrent only in an aggressive or attacking confrontation with a bear."

Studies
Studies suggest that bear spray is effective at reducing the risk of injury or death in these situations. While bear spray can be effective, authorities stress that proper bear-awareness and avoidance techniques are the best ways to minimize injuries due to human–bear conflict.

A 2008 "Efficacy of Bear Deterrent Spray in Alaska" study stated:

 Red pepper spray stopped bears' undesirable behavior 92% of the time when used on brown bears, 90% for black bears, and 100% for polar bears. 
 Of all persons carrying sprays, 98% were uninjured by bears in close-range encounters. 
 All bear-inflicted injuries (n=3) associated with defensive spraying involved brown bears and were relatively minor (i.e., no hospitalization required). 
 In 7% (5 of 71) of bear spray incidents, wind was reported to have interfered with spray accuracy, although it reached the bear in all cases. 
 In 14% (10 of 71) of bear spray incidents, users reported that the spray had affected themselves, ranging from minor irritation (11% of incidents, 8 of 71) to near incapacitation (3%, 2 of 71). 
 Bear spray represents an effective alternative to lethal force and should be considered as an option for personal safety for those recreating and working in bear country.

It should be understood, however, that the absolute risk from bears—even in grizzly (brown bear) country—is so low that bear spray cannot much decrease that risk. Bears are known to fatally attack only a relatively small number of backpackers in North America every decade, out of many millions—for instance, about 45,000 backcountry backpackers camp overnight in Yellowstone per year, roughly half of whom (48 percent) do not carry bear spray.

Legality

Bear spray is legal across the United States. It can be purchased even in Hawaii, New York, or Massachusetts, where standard pepper sprays are illegal unless bought locally by certified firearms dealers or pharmacists. In Canada, while legal for use against bears, bear spray is a prohibited weapon if intended to be used against humans.

While bear spray is illegal in some U.S. National Parks, visitors to the backcountry areas of Glacier and Yellowstone National Parks are encouraged to carry it. However, the Alaska Department of Natural Resources website notes that "Most people who hike in Alaska's wilderness don't carry a weapon. They know that the best defense is common sense. Traveling and camping carefully are all that they need." but goes on to advise those seeking greater protection to opt for bear spray, saying "This incapacitating spray teaches bears a lesson without permanently maiming them."

Bear sprays are considered a pesticide in the U.S. and must be registered with the EPA. The capsaicin in products sold in the U.S. are regulated by the EPA, under the FIFRA act by Congress.

Use against humans
It seems that bear spray was used, during the attack on the Capitol in Washington D.C., against Brian Sicknick, a police officer who died. Washington DC's medical examiner determined that Sicknick died of “natural causes – specifically, a series of strokes.” But the examiner emphasized that “all that transpired on [January 6] played a role in his condition”.

See also
 Bear danger

References

Bears
Bears and humans
Lachrymatory agents
Self-defense
Aerosol sprays